The Rara snowtrout (Schizothorax raraensis), is a cyprinid fish species of the genus Schizothorax. The Rara snowtrout was first collected in 1979 in the alpine fresh water Rara Lake located in Nepal's Rara National Park.

References 

Schizothorax
Lake fish of Asia
Fish described in 1984
Taxa named by Akira Terashima